This is a list of the official state symbols of the U.S. state of South Dakota.

Insignia

Species

Geology

Culture

See also
Outline of South Dakota
Index of South Dakota-related articles
Lists of United States state insignia
State of South Dakota

References

External links

State symbols
South Dakota